Trainer is a two-disc compilation released in 2000 by Plaid.  It includes the group's rare 1991 debut Mbuki Mvuki, as well as other hard-to-find or unreleased material.  Some of the tracks were recorded under Plaid's aliases Atypic, Balil and Tura.

Track listing

Disc one
"Uneasy Listening" – 5:37
"Anything" – 5:01
"Slice of Cheese" – 6:00
"Link" – 6:04
"Perplex" – 4:05
"Summit" – 4:38
"Bouncing Checks" – 5:29
"Yak" – 5:51
"Scoobs in Columbia" – 5:34
"Chirpy" – 4:47
"Prig" (as 'Atypic') – 4:52
"Eshush" (as 'Balil') – 4:42
"Blah" (as 'Atypic') – 4:47
"Norte Route" (as 'Balil') – 4:31

Disc two
"Fly Wings" – 4:06
"Whirling of Spirits" (as 'Balil') – 5:55
"Choke and Fly" (as 'Balil') – 5:51
"Small Energies" (as 'Balil') – 6:09
"Jolly" (as 'Atypic') – 6:07
"Letter" (as 'Tura') – 5:20
"Soft Key" (as 'Tura') – 5:18
"Reishi" (as 'Tura') – 9:01
"Uland" (as 'Balil') – 4:09
"Tan Sau" – 6:07
"Android" – 7:00
"Angry Dolphin" – 8:13

References

2000 compilation albums
Plaid (band) albums